William King (born 7 December 1959), also known as Bill King, is a Scottish writer of a number of science fiction and fantasy books, most notably in Games Workshop's Warhammer and Warhammer 40,000 series, published by Games Workshop's fiction arm Black Library.

Career
King wrote Trollslayer (1999), the first novel published under the Games Workshop's Black Library label.

His most memorable characters, Gotrek and Felix, have appeared in a series of novels, beginning with Trollslayer, a collection of previously published and new short stories. His next-most-famous character is Ragnar Blackmane, a Space Marine from the Warhammer 40,000 game setting universe (although the character was already in existence in the game and background material, King took him and expanded his history in the novel series).

In 2010, he signed a three-book deal with Black Library that will focus on elven brothers Tyrion and Teclis.

Prior to moving to the Czech Republic, King spent a number of years as a designer for GW, contributing to their game universes (where much of his fiction is also set).  He has also written a tetralogy of books featuring the Death's Angels which are available in the Czech Republic, Spain and Germany.

He married his long-time girlfriend, Radka, on 24 September 2005, and lives in Prague with his family.

King's latest work has been Illidan: World of Warcraft for Blizzard Entertainment, released in March 2016.

Bibliography

Novel series
Gotrek and Felix series

Trollslayer (1999)
Skavenslayer (1999)
Daemonslayer (1999)
Dragonslayer (2000)
Beastslayer (2001)
Vampireslayer (2001)
Giantslayer (2003)

Tyrion and Teclis trilogy

Blood of Aenarion (2011)
Sword of Caledor (2012)
Bane of Malekith (2013)

Macharian Crusade trilogy

Angel of Fire (2012)
Fist of Demetrius (2013)
Fall of Macharius (2014)

Ragnar Blackmane series

Space Wolf
Ragnar's Claw
Grey Hunter
Wolfblade

Terrarch tetralogy

Death's Angels
Tower of Serpents
The Queen's Assassin
Armies of the Dead (renamed as Shadowblood)

Short stories

 "Green Troops"
 "Red Garden"
 "Visiting the Dead"
 "Skyrider"
 "The Price of Their Toys"
 "The Laughter of Dark Gods"
 "Geheimnisnacht"
 "Wolf Riders"
 "Dark Beneath the World"
 "Uptown Girl"
 "Deathwing" (with B. Ansell)
 "Devil’s Marauders"
 "Skaven's Claw"
 "Easy Steps to Posthumanity"
 "The Mutant Master"
 "In the Belly of the Beast"
 "Ulric’s Children"
 "Blood and Darkness"
 "The Mark of Slaanesh"
 "The Ultimate Ritual" (with N Jones)
 "The Wrath of Khârn"
 "Redhand's Daughter"
 "The Guardian of the Dawn"
 "The Servants of the Dark Master"

Other works

Farseer
Laughter of Dark Gods (short stories anthology)
The Inquiry Agent (a Victorian mystery)
Illidan: World of Warcraft
Warzone: Mutant Chronicles

References

External links
William King's official blog
The Black Library official website

1959 births
People from Stranraer
20th-century British novelists
21st-century British novelists
British expatriates in the Czech Republic
British fantasy writers
British male novelists
British science fiction writers
Games Workshop
Living people
Writers from Prague
Scottish fantasy writers
Scottish science fiction writers
Warhammer Fantasy writers
Warhammer 40,000 writers
20th-century British male writers
21st-century English male writers